Juan Pablo Ocegueda de Alba (born July 13, 1993) is an American professional soccer player who currently plays as a left-back for Los Angeles Force in the National Independent Soccer Association.  He previously played in the UANL academy, Oaxaca, Orange County SC, Sahuayo F.C, and California United Strikers.

Club career
Ocegueda spent the bulk of his youth career in Tigres' academy.  In July 2013, he was loaned to Chivas for the Apertura season, but he did not play for the club's first team.

Back with Tigres, Ocegueda made his professional debut on March 13, 2014, in a Copa MX match against Puebla.

International career
Ocegueda played for the US under-20 national team in the 2013 CONCACAF U-20 Championship and the 2013 FIFA U-20 World Cup.  Ocegueda announced he would no longer play for the U.S. after joining Chivas, who have a strict Mexican-only policy.  However, Ocegueda left Chivas after just half a season when his loan to the club expired.

References

External links

1993 births
Living people
American sportspeople of Mexican descent
American soccer players
American expatriate soccer players
Tigres UANL footballers
Orange County SC players
California United Strikers FC players
Los Angeles Force players
American expatriate sportspeople in Mexico
Soccer players from Riverside, California
Expatriate footballers in Mexico
United States men's youth international soccer players
United States men's under-20 international soccer players
United States men's under-23 international soccer players
USL Championship players
Association football fullbacks
Alebrijes de Oaxaca players
United Premier Soccer League players
National Independent Soccer Association players